The Banadir Maternity & Children Hospital is a teaching hospital in the Wadajir District (Medina) of Mogadishu, Somalia. Built in 1977 as part of a Chinese development project, it became the nexus of a humanitarian crisis in 2011.  The hospital comprises a maternity unit and a pediatric unit.

Banadir Hospital is a public hospital located in Mogadishu, the capital of Somalia. It is the largest hospital in the country and serves as a referral center for patients from all over Somalia. The hospital offers a range of medical services, including surgery, obstetrics and gynecology, pediatrics, internal medicine, and orthopedics. It also has a laboratory and a pharmacy. The hospital has been providing essential healthcare to the Somali people for many years and has played a crucial role in addressing the healthcare needs of the country.

In Mogadishu and its surrounds, the Hospital serves roughly 3,000,000 people. The hospital’s perimeter (area) is 300m2, with 300m X 250m being constructed and 300m X 50 being left undeveloped. More than 3000 individuals use Banadir Hospital’s health services on a monthly basis since it is a referral hospital for the neediest members of society.

References

External links

Hospital buildings completed in 1977
Maternity hospitals in Somalia
Hospitals in Somalia
Medical education in Somalia
Teaching hospitals
Hospitals established in 1977
1977 establishments in Somalia